Marian Damaschin (born 1 May 1965) is a Romanian former professional footballer who played as a striker.

Club career
Marian Damaschin was born on 1 May 1965 in Urziceni, Romania, starting to play football at Rapid București, including spending one season in Divizia A in which he scored two goals in 25 matches. In 1984 he was transferred at fellow Divizia A club, Politehnica Iași where he spent one season in which scored 9 goals in 34 appearances, at the end of the it being transferred at Dinamo București. In his first season spent with The Red Dogs he managed to win a Cupa României, scoring the only goal of the 1–0 victory in the final against rival and recently European Cup winner, Steaua București. In the middle of the 1987–88 season, he was transferred at Victoria București in exchange for Claudiu Vaișcovici, where in one year and a half he scored 17 goals in 42 Divizia A games and helped the club reach the quarterfinals of the 1988–89 UEFA Cup in which he played 8 games in the campaign, afterwards returning at Dinamo. In the 1989–90 season under the guidance of coach Mircea Lucescu, Dinamo won the title and the cup with Damaschin playing 5 Divizia A games in which he scored one goal, also the team reached the 1989–90 UEFA Cup Winners' Cup semi-finals with Damaschin playing one game in the campaign. In the following season he scored 15 goals in 31 Divizia A matches for Dinamo which earned him a transfer in Netherlands at Feyenoord where he was colleague with fellow Romanian, Ioan Sabău. He spent one season with The Club on the Meuse, making his debut on 14 August 1991 when coach Hans Dorjee used him all the game in the 1–0 victory against PSV Eindhoven from the 1991 Dutch Supercup in which he scored the goal, three days later he made his Eredivise debut in a 1–0 victory against Twente, making a total of 29 appearances with 9 goals scored as the club finished 3rd in the competition, also he played two games and scored one goal as the club won the 1991–92 Dutch Cup and he helped the team reach the 1991–92 European Cup Winners' Cup semi-finals making 5 appearances in which he scored one goal in the semi-finals against AS Monaco. Marian Damaschin ended his career by spending one season in France at Championnat National club, Grenoble Isère. He has a total of 185
Divizia A matches in which he scored 55 goals, 29 appearances with 9 goals in Eredivise and 22 matches with two goals scored in European competitions.

International career
Marian Damaschin played 5 friendly games at international level for Romania, making his debut on 2 March 1986 when coach Mircea Lucescu sent him on the field in the 65th minute in order to replace Romulus Gabor in a 1–0 victory against Egypt. His following four games were a 1–1 and a 0–0 against Iraq and a 2–2 and a 1–0 loss against Norway, the last game being the only one in which he played as a starter.

Personal life
His son, Mihai Damaschin was also a footballer.

Honours
Dinamo București
Divizia A: 1989–90
Cupa României: 1985–86, 1989–90
Feyenoord
Dutch Cup: 1991–92
Dutch Supercup: 1991

References

1965 births
Living people
People from Urziceni
Romanian footballers
Association football forwards
Romania international footballers
FC Rapid București players
FC Politehnica Iași (1945) players
FC Dinamo București players
Feyenoord players
Grenoble Foot 38 players
Eredivisie players
Liga I players
Romanian expatriate footballers
Expatriate footballers in the Netherlands
Romanian expatriate sportspeople in the Netherlands
Expatriate footballers in France
Romanian expatriate sportspeople in France